was a Japanese video game publisher that produced video games, anime and manga. Enix is known for publishing the Dragon Quest series of role-playing video games.

The name "Enix" is a play on the words "phoenix", a mythical bird that is reborn from its own ashes, and "ENIAC", the world's first digital computer.

The company merged with rival Square in 2003 to form Square Enix.

History
Enix was founded on September 22, 1975, as Eidansha Boshu Service Center by Japanese architect-turned-entrepreneur Yasuhiro Fukushima. The company initially published tabloids that advertised real estate.

On February 5, 1980, Eidansha Boshu Service created a wholly owned subsidiary Eidansya Fudousan for the purpose of specializing in real estate trading and brokerage. Eidansya Fudousan took the name Eidansha Systems on August 18. 1981. The following year, on August 30, 1982, Eidansha Systems was renamed Enix Corporation.

After a failed attempt of Eidansha Boshu Service to go nationwide in 1982, its newly established Enix subsidiary began a foray into the gaming market by holding a personal computer game programming contest. One of the winners was Love Match Tennis, created by Yuji Horii. It would go on to become one of the company's first PC releases. Another winner was the puzzle game Door Door by Koichi Nakamura, which would become one of the company's better known home computer titles. The game was subsequently ported to the Nintendo Family Computer, but never saw any form of release outside Japan. Nakamura would stay on board as one Enix's key programmers.

Over the next few years, Enix published several video games for various Japanese home computer systems. Rather than developing games within its own company, Enix would continue to outsource the production of its games to other developers through the use of royalties. Enix is perhaps most famous for publishing the Dragon Quest series of console games (released as Dragon Warrior in North America until 2005) developed by Chunsoft. Key members of the developer's staff consisted of director Koichi Nakamura, writer Yuuji Horii, artist Akira Toriyama, and composer Koichi Sugiyama, among others. The first game in the Famicom-based RPG series was released in 1986, and would eventually sell 1.5 million copies in Japan, establishing Dragon Quest as the company's most profitable franchise.

On April 1, 1989, the original Enix Corporation along with two sister companies (Konika Enix and Enix Products) were unified and merged into their parent Eidansha Boshu Service who then renamed itself Enix Corporation.

In 1991, Enix registered its stock with the Japan Securities Dealers Association, later known as JASDAQ. Enix soon began publishing manga from its shonen magazine Monthly Shōnen Gangan. The company established ties with more video game developers and would go on to publish several games for fourth, fifth, and sixth generation game consoles. Despite the announcement that Enix's long-time competitor Square Co., Ltd. would develop exclusively for Sony PlayStation, Enix announced in January 1997 that it would release games for both Nintendo and Sony consoles. This caused a significant rise in stock for both Enix and Sony. By November 1999, Enix was listed in the Tokyo Stock Exchange's 1st section, indicating it as a "large company."

Merger with Square
In June 2001, Enix expressed interest in partnering with both Square and Namco in online ventures to deal with mounting development costs. That same month, Enix invested in the company Game Arts, acquiring ¥99.2 million worth of stock shares in order to publish the latter's Grandia series. Despite Enix's marketing of Dragon Quest VII in 1999, the game was delayed numerous times and not released until 2000. As a result, the game didn't (as had been expected) contribute to the fiscal year 1999, cutting the company's previous profit-to-sales ratio in half and causing its stock value to drop by 40% in early 2000. Enix was further hurt by a delay of Dragon Quest Monsters 2 in Japan in 2001, dropping its first-half 2001 fiscal year profit by 89.71%.

Enix's competitor Square also suffered financially in 2001, mainly from the box office failure of its feature film Final Fantasy: The Spirits Within. This made Enix hesitant to join with the company. However, it was announced on November 26, 2002, that the two companies would merge the following year in order to mutually decrease development costs and to compete with foreign developers. The merge was delayed until April 1, 2003, when the new merged entity Square Enix came into being, with Enix as the surviving company.  As part of the merger, former Square president Yoichi Wada was appointed the president of the new corporation, while former Enix president Keiji Honda became its vice president.The founder of Enix and the largest shareholder of the newly combined corporation, Yasuhiro Fukushima, was made its honorary chairman.

On October 1, 2008, Square Enix (the former Enix Corporation) renamed itself Square Enix Holdings and became a pure holding company. On that same date, a new video game company called Square Enix was created as a subsidiary of Square Enix Holdings.

Subsidiaries

Asia
Digital Entertainment Academy Co., Ltd. was established as a partially owned subsidiary in 1991. Originally called Toshima Ku Hokkaido University, the school was founded to teach game development. As of April 2008, it is funded by 20 gaming corporations, including Square Enix.

Square Enix Webstar Network Technology (Beijing) Co., Ltd. was a company formed between Enix and Mauritius Webstar Inc. in 2001 to develop online and mobile phone games in China and, later, other parts of Asia. One of the products includes the MMORPG Cross Gate. The subsidiary was carried over after the merger between Square and Enix, but was dissolved in 2005 after the establishment of Square Enix China.

North America
Enix America Corporation was the corporation's first American localization subsidiary based in Redmond, Washington. It was organized after the release of Dragon Warrior by Nintendo of America in 1989. The subsidiary came into existence in 1990, but closed in November 1995 when the parent company decided to no longer release products in North America due to poor sales. One of the games they published, King Arthur & the Knights of Justice, was Enix's first and only North America exclusive game.

Enix America, Inc., Enix's last American localization subsidiary, was organized in 1999 after the release of Dragon Warrior Monsters through a joint venture with Eidos. Paul Handelman, who was part of Enix America Corporation's staff, returned to lead Enix America, Inc. as president. The corporation was in existence until 2003, ceasing to exist after the merger with Square Co., Ltd. It was based in Seattle, Washington.

Products

Video games

From 1983 to 1993, Enix published games for Japanese home computers including the NEC PC-8801, MSX, Sharp X68000, and FM-7. Beginning on the Famicom, Enix published the very successful Dragon Quest series, which, after the formation of Square Enix, had already sold over 78 million copies worldwide. Although the first few titles were developed by Chunsoft, other companies would also develop main installments, spin-offs, and remakes for the series including Heartbeat, ArtePiazza, TOSE, and Level-5. The Dragon Quest franchise would carry over as one of Square Enix's most important assets. Other notable franchises published by Enix include the acclaimed Star Ocean and Valkyrie Profile series by tri-Ace, both of which would also continue with Square Enix. The company Quintet developed several role-playing games for Enix such as ActRaiser, Robotrek, Soul Blazer, Illusion of Gaia, and Terranigma for the Super NES.

Manga and toys
Enix began publishing manga in 1991 in its own Gangan Comics publications, which originally consisted of Monthly Shōnen Gangan, Monthly Gangan Wing, and Monthly GFantasy.

Other products
In November 2000, Enix set up a subsidiary titled BMF in Kawasaki, Kanagawa Prefecture to handle a fingerprint identification systems operation. Enix took a 68% stake in 200 million yen capitalization. The subsidiary was expected to post a pretax profit of 12 million yen on sales of 135 million yen in the first five months of operation. In September 2002, Enix entered a joint venture with Waseda University to distribute broadband sports content. The subsidiary, Sports BB, was owned 80% by Enix and 20% by the college.

References

External links
Official website  (archives)
Official website  (archives)

 
Video game publishers
Video game companies established in 1975
Video game companies disestablished in 2003
Defunct video game companies of Japan
Japanese companies established in 1975
Japanese companies disestablished in 2003
2003 mergers and acquisitions